Riccardo Rossi may refer to:
 Riccardo Rossi (motorcyclist) (born 2002), Italian motorcycle racer
 Riccardo Rossi (politician) (born 1964), Italian politician
 Riccardo Rossi (voice actor) (born 1963), Italian voice actor